Claire Morissette (April 6, 1950 – July 20, 2007) was a Canadian cycling advocate who fought for equal cyclists' rights in Montreal since 1976. She was a member of the group Le Monde à Bicyclette. Notable were the stunts they organized to raise consciousness of automobile transportation's negative impact on cities and their inhabitants, such as bringing snow skis and toboggans on subways to protest the exclusion of bicycles and a die-in on the corner of St. Catherine and University streets in which 100 people lay in the street adorned with fake blood and surrounded with wrecked bikes.
  She published a book in 1994, Deux roues, un avenir (Two Wheels, One Future), available only in French. The book promotes using bikes for urban transportation.

In 1999, she founded Cyclo Nord-Sud, an organization that gives used bikes to third world countries. They have shipped over 20,000 bikes to 13 countries. In the same year, she also founded Communauto, a car-share company.

She died on July 20, 2007, aged 57, following a battle with breast cancer. In her honour, on June 16, 2008, Montreal's city council voted unanimously to name its De Maisonneuve Boulevard bicycle path after Morissette.

Bibliography 

 Deux roues, un avenir : le vélo en ville (Two Wheels, One Future)(1994), écosociété.

Awards 

 2007 - Prix Thérèse-Daviau (awarded posthumously)
 2017 - Honoured in the exhibition "Place aux femmes" at City Hall as part of Montreal's 375th anniversary

References

External links
 Photos of "Die-in"
 Preface to Two Wheels, One Future
 Claire Morissette on Treehugger.com
 Claire Morissette on MPG.com
 Obituary on Pedalmag.com

2007 deaths
Activists from Montreal
Deaths from breast cancer
French Quebecers
Deaths from cancer in Quebec
1950 births
Cycling advocates
Canadian women activists